Air Scotland was a low-cost airline based in Glasgow, Scotland. It operated scheduled services from Glasgow International Airport, and other UK airports, to the Mediterranean and Athens using the air operator's certificate of Greece Airways, a Greek registered company and licensed by the Greek Civil Aviation Authority.

The airline formerly known as Air Scotland is no longer operating, as the Greek Civil Aviation Authority suspended their Operating Licence and AOC in December 2006.

History
Air Scotland was established in November 2002 by Iraqi-born businessman Dhia Al-Ani and started operations on 29 March 2003, using 2 Boeing 757-200 aircraft operated by Electra Airlines, to Spanish holiday resorts. The company was a ticket provider for Electra Airlines until 25 April 2003, when the Electra aircraft were grounded by BAA plc over debts owed to the airport operator. Air Scotland ceased the agreement with Electra and began operating with Air Holland, who agreed to resume operation of the former Electra routes. With the demise of Air Holland, it then began operating under the air operator's certificate of Greece Airways, which was formed out of Electra and owned by Mr Al-Ani, albeit with only one 757 aircraft. All aircraft (before 2006) that have operated for Air Scotland have carried the operator's livery of white fuselage with the Flag of Scotland design on the aircraft tailfin.

Under Mr Al-Ani's ownership, there were reports of Air Scotland looking to lease two Lockheed L-1011 Tristar to utilise on services from Glasgow to Miami, New York City and Cuba, and to fly between Glasgow and London Stansted Airport to Baghdad, but these failed to materialise.

At the start of October 2005 Mr Al-Ani sold his stake in the airline to H Top Hotels Group of Barcelona, Spain. However, administrative difficulties in transferring ownership of the airline resulted in the operator's solitary aircraft being grounded at Palma over unpaid fuel bills. Passengers were left stranded for up to 17 hours and in one instance armed police were called to calm angry passengers delayed in Palma. The knock-on effect to the airline's network as a result of the delay was considerable. An aircraft was chartered from Fischer Air Polska to help clear the backlog, but returned to Poland empty after the pilot refused service to Air Scotland as he believed that they had not paid. Air Scotland had in fact transferred money to Fischer Air Polska's account that morning.

Destinations
Taken from air-Scotland.com in 2006:
 Greece
 Athens – Athens International Airport
 Spain
 Alicante – Alicante Airport
 Barcelona – Barcelona Airport
 Girona – Girona Airport
 Málaga – Málaga Airport
 Palma de Mallorca – Palma  de Mallorca Airport
 Kuwait
 Kuwait - Kuwait International Airport
 United Kingdom
 England
 Birmingham – Birmingham Airport
 Bristol – Bristol Airport
 Doncaster – Doncaster Sheffield Airport
 Manchester – Manchester Airport Focus City
 Newcastle – Newcastle Airport
 Norwich – Norwich Airport
 Northern Ireland
 Belfast – Belfast International Airport
 Scotland
 Glasgow – Glasgow Airport Base
Aberdeen - Aberdeen Airport

 Wales
 Cardiff – Cardiff Airport

Fleet

On the day the Airline ceased trading, it operated a single A320-211 based in Glasgow, it had also operated a Boeing 757-200 which wore a combination of Air Scotland & Greece Airways decals.

See also
 List of defunct airlines of the United Kingdom

References

External links

 Photos of Air Scotland aircraft
 Scotland Photo Database - Air Scotland.

Defunct airlines of Scotland
Defunct airlines of Greece
Airlines established in 2002
Airlines disestablished in 2006
2002 establishments in Scotland
Transport in Scotland
Companies of Scotland
Aviation in Scotland
Defunct European low-cost airlines
British companies established in 2002